Gogne Subregion is a subregion in the western Gash-Barka region of Eritrea. Its capital lies at Gogne.

Towns and villages
Ad Casub
Gogne
Hambok
Markaughe

References

Awate.com: Martyr Statistics

Gash-Barka Region
Subregions of Eritrea